William Samuel Davis (born 6 March 1996) is an English cricketer. He made his first-class debut for Derbyshire against the Australians on 23 July 2015. Davis left Derbyshire at the end of the 2018 season to join Leicestershire. He made his Twenty20 debut on 1 May 2019, for Leicestershire against the touring Pakistan team.

References

External links
 
 

1996 births
Living people
English cricketers
Derbyshire cricketers
Leicestershire cricketers
Sportspeople from Stafford